Sathanur is a village located near Yelahanka in Bangalore of Karnataka, India.

Transport
Sathanur is located at 9 km from Yelahanka.

Bus
Bus routes 401BK, 289, 289A, 289B, 289C, 289E, 289F, 289H, 289J, 289K,   289Z, 289L, 289P, 289M serve Sathanur

Rail
Yelahanka Jn. is the nearest railway station

References

Villages in Bangalore Urban district